The Forêt d'Orient (Orient Forest) National Nature Reserve (RNN154) is a national nature reserve located in Champagne-Ardenne in the Grand Est region in France. Located within the Orient Forest Regional Natural Park, it was created in 2002 and protects 1,560 hectares of lake and forest areas.

Localisation 

The territory of the nature reserve is located in Aube department in communes of Amance, Brévonnes, Mathaux, Piney and Radonvilliers within Orient Forest Regional Natural Park and 25 km east of Troyes. It includes part of the Orient, Amance and Temple lakes.

History of site and reserve 
The great lakes of Seine were set up from the 1960s to protect Paris from floods. Their completion in the 1990s allowed the establishment of peripheral natural environments linked to their presence. The protection of these environments was ensured by the creation of the nature reserve in 2002.

Ecology (biodiversity, ecological interest, etc.) 

The site interest is due to its location on the migratory routes of several species of waterbirds. There are mainly 3 main types of environments:

 lake environments with a fluctuating water level which generates areas of mudflats;
 grassland environments staggered according to their humidity (meadows, reed beds);
 forest environments made up of oak woods and charms.

The whole creates very varied habitats.

Flora 
The variations in the water level of the lakes and areas of mudflats that result from it generate very rich environments sheltering an aquatic flora. There are remarkable species such as the Ranunculus lingua or the Pulicaria vulgaris.

Wildlife 
There are around 40 species of mammals frequenting the site. There are also 24 heritage species, including 16 species of bats. Some of the protected species are the wildcat, polecat (Mustela putorius putorius), barbastella as well as the Eurasian otter.

The site is known for its remarkable bird life linked to aquatic or forest environments. It has more than 200 species, 92 of which are nesting. Among migratory species, we find the black stork, greater white-fronted and greylag geese, Bewick's swan (Cygnus columbianus bewickii), Eurasian teal, common goldeneye, smew, etc.

Amphibians include the yellow-bellied toad, fire salamander, and the Northern crested newt. Three heritage species of reptiles are present: the grass snake, the slow-worm and the viviparous lizard.

The site is very rich in beetles (800 inventoried species) and dragonflies.

Touristic and educational interest 

The interior of the nature reserve is closed to the public. Sites on the outskirts, such as the Valois observatory, allow visitors to observe the flora and fauna without disturbing them. Trips to the periphery of the reserve as well as articles published in various journals also allow the public to learn about the actions carried out on the reserve. At Maison du Parc, video cameras installed on the site allow visitors to experience the highlights of the reserve

Administration, management plan, regulations 
The nature reserve is managed by the Orient Forest Regional Natural Park.

Tools and legal status 
The nature reserve was created by a decree of July 9, 2002. Its territory also forms part of the following zonings: Zone Ramsar  « Etangs de la Champagne humide », ZICO n°CA02, ZNIEFF de type I  et de type II , ZPS « Lacs de la Forêt d'Orient », ZSC « Forêt d'Orient ».

References 

Protected areas established in 2002
Regional natural parks of France
Geography of Aube
Tourist attractions in Aube